Goran Talevski (born 20 May 1982 in Australia) is an Australian retired soccer player.

Career

In 2003, Talevski signed for HNK Hajduk Split, one of the most successful teams in Croatia. He liked the full-time environment there, saying that "training sometime three times a day was excellent for me". However, he left due to financial problems and trialed with Brisbane Roar in the newly formed Australian A-League, but failed to land a contract.

In 2007, Talevski was regarded as one of the top 10 players in Australia outside of the A-League.

References

External links
 

Australian soccer players
Living people
Association football midfielders
1982 births
HNK Hajduk Split players
Rockdale Ilinden FC players
Marconi Stallions FC players
Sydney United 58 FC players
Australian people of Macedonian descent
Caroline Springs George Cross FC players